Francisco Córdova (born April 26, 1972) is a Mexican former Major League Baseball right-handed starting pitcher .

Career
On January 18, 1996, Córdova was signed by the Pittsburgh Pirates as an amateur free agent. He made his major league debut on April 2, 1996. The following year, on July 12, at a sold out Three Rivers Stadium, he pitched nine innings of a combined 10-inning no-hitter for the Pirates. Ricardo Rincón pitched the 10th inning. The Pirates won the game on a dramatic three-run, pinch hit home run in the bottom of the 10th by Mark Smith. This game pitched by Córdova and Rincón is recognized as the only combined, extra-inning no-hitter in modern MLB history and is the last no-hitter in Pirates history to date. Córdova would go on the post an 11–8 record that season.

His career was shorted by arm troubles, after going through reconstructive elbow surgery in 2001, and missing the entire 2002 season, he signed with the San Diego Padres before the 2003 season, but failed to make the team after spring training and he retired with a 42–47 record.

After his MLB stint, Cordova pitched in his native Mexico from 2002 through 2011 with the Mexico City Tigres, the Mexico City Diablos Rojos, and the Petroleros de Minatitlán.

References

External links

1972 births
Altoona Curve players
Baseball players from Veracruz
Living people
Major League Baseball pitchers
Major League Baseball players from Mexico
Mexican expatriate baseball players in the United States
Nashville Sounds players
Baseball players at the 2003 Pan American Games
Pan American Games bronze medalists for Mexico
Pan American Games medalists in baseball
Pittsburgh Pirates players
Medalists at the 2003 Pan American Games
Algodoneros de Guasave players
Diablos Rojos del México players
Petroleros de Minatitlán players